The International Sumo Federation (IFS) is the largest international governing body of sport Sumo with over 87 member countries. It was formed in 1992 and is the only Sumo organization recognised by the International Olympic Committee and World Anti-Doping Agency.

History

Members
International Sumo Federation has 87 established National Sumo Federations.

Organization
International Sumo Federation encourages the sport's development worldwide, including holding international championships. A key aim of the federation is to have Sumo recognized as an Olympic sport. Accordingly, amateur tournaments are divided into weight classes.

Weight classes

1992–2018

 Age restrictions of 13–18 years old apply

2019–present

 Age restrictions of 13–18 years old apply

Presidents

Events

Discipline championships
Sumo World Championships
European Sumo Championships
North American Sumo Championships
Oceania Sumo Championships

Other events
Sumo at the World Games
Sumo at the 2013 World Combat Games

See also

Australian Sumo Federation
Japan Sumo Association
US Sumo Federation

References

External links
 

Sumo organizations
IOC-recognised international federations
Sports organizations established in 1992
Martial arts organizations